Chengelo School is a coeducational Christian school in Mkushi in the Central Province of Zambia. Chengelo School caters for Primary, Secondary and Sixth Form students. The campus sporting facilities include soccer fields, a rugby pitch, a 4m running track, netball and basketball courts and a swimming pool.

Chengelo School was founded in September 1988 by the Mkushi Christian Fellowship. Since then Chengelo has grown to about 490 students, with over 110 staff. Supporters of the school included the late President of the Republic of Zambia, Levy Mwanawasa, whose children attended Chengelo. The school's history, and concept of Christian Education as well as the statement for the vision of the School are all available on the Chengelo School Website.

The founding headmaster was Neil Solomon.

Ndubaluba Outdoor Centre
Situated fifteen kilometres from the main campus is the Ndubaluba Outdoor Centre. The centre was opened in 1993 by Chengelo's founding headmaster Neil Solomon, and his wife Ruby. The centre was named after Lady Ross' Lourie known locally as an 'Ndubaluba bird'. The centre was used to run A level correspondence courses as well as outdoor activities, but soon focused solely on outdoor and adventure education. After the departure of Neil and Ruby Solomon, running of the centre was taken over by Richard Thompson who is centre manager to the present day.

Ndubaluba is closely associated with Chengelo, whose students attend expeditions to face challenges and learn leadership skills outside of the classroom setting, for example expeditions to Mount Mumpu.

Ndubaluba also caters to overseas groups, local Government schools, schools for children with special needs, corporations and independent schools in Zambia.

References

External links
 Chengelo School
 Ndubaluba Outdoor Centre

Educational institutions established in 1988
Cambridge schools in Zambia
Private schools in Zambia
Secondary schools in Zambia
Boarding schools in Zambia
Central Province, Zambia
1988 establishments in Zambia